The  was a Japanese domain of the Edo period, located in Nagato Province. It was ruled for the entirety of its history by a branch of the Mōri clan of the neighboring Chōshū Domain.

List of lords

Mōri clan (Tozama; 10,000 koku)

Mototomo
Motohira
Masanari
Masakuni
Masaaki
Motoyo
Mototsugu
Motozumi

References
 Kiyosue on "Edo 300 HTML" (21 Oct. 2007)

Domains of Japan